Zhenguan may refer to:

Zhenguan (斟灌), an ancient Chinese state during the Xia dynasty before 2010 BC, located in approximately modern Shouguang, Shandong

Historical eras
Zhenguan (貞觀, 627–649), era name used by Emperor Taizong of Tang
Zhenguan (貞觀, 1101–1113), era name used by Emperor Chongzong of Western Xia